Jean Baptiste Auguste Dampt (1854–1945) was a French sculptor, medalist, and jeweler.

Biography
Born in Venarey-les-Laumes as the son of a cabinetmaker, Dampt studied at the École des Beaux-Arts in Dijon, then in 1874 under the leadership of François Jouffroy and Paul Dubois at the École nationale supérieure des Beaux-Arts in Paris . He exhibited for the first time at the Salon of the Société des Artistes Français in 1876.  In 1877 he took the deuxième Prix de Rome for sculpture at the Ecole.  He completed his military service, then organized an Exhibition of the Society of Friends of the Gold Coast to promote art in its region.

Dampt's work can be described as Symbolist; at the Musée d'Orsay he is classified as Art Nouveau.  Some of Dampt's sculptures are exhibited at the Museum of Fine Arts in Dijon.

In 1919 Dampt was appointed to chair #7 of the Académie des Beaux-Arts.  Dampt's students include the Americans Frederick Ruckstull, Charles Grafly, and Cyrus Edwin Dallin, and the Swiss Jean Dunand.  The animalier François Pompon was an assistant.

Les Cinq 

In 1895, Dampt was a founding member of the arts group Les Cinq, which sought to apply new mechanical methods to furniture design.  The four other founding members were architect Tony Selmersheim, designer Felix Aubert, sculptor and craftsman Alexandre Charpentier, and the painter Étienne Moreau-Nélaton.  Architect Charles Plumet would join in 1896, changing the group's name first to Les Six and then to L'Art pour tous with the later association of Henri Sauvage and others.

References 

 This page translated from its French equivalent, accessed 4/22/2011

External links

 

1854 births
1945 deaths
French medallists
Prix de Rome for sculpture
École des Beaux-Arts alumni
Members of the Académie des beaux-arts
Art Nouveau sculptors
Art Nouveau medallists
People from Côte-d'Or
20th-century French sculptors
20th-century French male artists
19th-century French sculptors
French male sculptors
French cabinetmakers
19th-century French male artists